State Highway 4, abbreviated as SH-4 or OK-4, is a designation for two distinct highways maintained by the U.S. state of Oklahoma. One of them serves as an important route through the suburbs west of Oklahoma City, while the other connects US-259 to the Arkansas state line west of Cove, Arkansas. SH-4 has no lettered spur routes.

The two SH-4s were never connected. The Central Oklahoma highway was established in 1941 and gradually extended to its present extent between then and 2003. The Eastern Oklahoma highway was originally numbered SH-21, and was renumbered to SH-4 in 1963.

Route description

Central Oklahoma

It begins at the eastern terminus of the H.E. Bailey Turnpike Spur south of Newcastle, Oklahoma. It is a two-lane road until it reaches SH-37, where it expands to four lanes.  later, it joins with SH-152 in the town of Mustang.  later, SH-4 continues northward along Mustang Road toward Interstate 40 and Yukon.

After crossing I-40, SH-4 becomes a two-lane road once again until entering Yukon, at which point it becomes a four-lane road again. It meets SH-66, once Route 66, in Yukon.  later, it meets the Northwest Expressway (SH-3). It lasts for just  longer until ending at Edmond Road in Piedmont.

Just after crossing SH-3, there is a standard distance sign listing Piedmont and "END OF ROUTE", giving the distance to the terminus of SH-4. This is a relative rarity on Oklahoma highways.

Eastern Oklahoma
It begins at US-259 and goes generally east–west, passing through the unincorporated communities of Smithville and Watson. After crossing the Arkansas state line, it becomes Highway 4.

History

Central Oklahoma
The western SH-4 was assigned in 1941 to a previously unnumbered roadway between U.S. Highway 66 in Yukon and Piedmont. A continuation of SH-4 east to North May Avenue in Oklahoma City along Ranchwood Boulevard and NW 10th Street had been designated as a farm-to-market road four years earlier. In 1954, SH-4 was extended eastward along the farm-to-market road to a terminus at State Highway 3 and State Highway 74 (May Avenue) southwest of downtown Oklahoma City.

SH-4 remained unchanged until 1979 when it was truncated to its former southern terminus at US-66 in Yukon. The route was then extended to Mustang in 1982, following Ranchwood Boulevard and Mustang Road south to a new terminus at State Highway 152. Construction on a southward extension of SH-4 to State Highway 37 near Tuttle began in 2001 and was completed a year later, as was a new segment between SH-37 and the H.E. Bailey Turnpike (Interstate 44). SH-4 was originally signed only as far south as SH-37; the designation was extended south to I-44 in early 2003.

On August 9, 2021 the Oklahoma Transportation Commission voted to approve the addition of the State Highway 4 designation to the H.E. Bailey Spur.

Eastern Oklahoma
What is now the eastern SH-4 became part of State Highway 21 in 1927 when SH-21 was rerouted north of Bethel to follow modern U.S. Highway 259 and SH-4 to the Arkansas state line. The SH-21 designation was removed in 1963 and replaced with SH-4 from Smithville east to the state line near Watson. Only minor realignments, such as the straightening of the roadway near Smithville and the replacement of a historic truss bridge by a modern span have occurred since.

Junction list

Central Oklahoma

Eastern Oklahoma

References

External links

 Eastern SH-4 at OKHighways
 Western SH-4 at OKHighways

004
Transportation in Oklahoma City
Transportation in Grady County, Oklahoma
Transportation in Canadian County, Oklahoma
Transportation in McCurtain County, Oklahoma